Karin Grasshof or Karin Graßhof (born 25 June 1937 in Kiel) is a German jurist. She served as a justice of the Federal Constitutional Court of Germany from 1986 to 1998. She is currently an honorary professor at the University of Bonn.

As a judge, she was involved in the decision of the Federal Constitutional Court of September 14, 1989, on the use of the diary of a prisoner; the decision on the five-percent hurdle in the first all-German election; the decision on the right of foreigners to vote in Schleswig-Holstein; the decision on Section 218 of May 28, 1993; the Maastricht ruling of October 12, 1993; the AWACS decision of July 12, 1994; the decision on the criminal liability of GDR foreign espionage of May 15, 1995; the decision on the Mauerschützenprozesse of October 26, 1996; the decisions on the admissibility of overhang mandates of April 10, 1997 and February 26, 1998; and the decision on the introduction of the euro of March 31, 1998.

References

German women judges
Justices of the Federal Constitutional Court
1937 births
Living people
Jurists from Kiel
Constitutional court women judges
German women lawyers
20th-century German lawyers
20th-century German judges
Grand Crosses with Star and Sash of the Order of Merit of the Federal Republic of Germany
20th-century women lawyers
20th-century women judges
20th-century German women